Marcella Lowery (born April 27, 1946) is an American actress. She is known for her roles as Geoffrey Owens' mother, Francine Tibideaux, on The Cosby Show, Jamal Jenkins' grandmother on Ghostwriter from 1992 to 1995, Anna Eldridge in the 1996 film,  The Preacher's Wife and as Principal Karen Noble on the NBC sitcom City Guys.

Lowery was born in Queens, New York. She had a recurring role on The Cosby Show as Francine Tibideaux, the mother of Elvin Tibideaux and mother-in-law of Sondra Huxtable, as well as a brief role in What About Bob?. She was also in The Preacher's Wife and guest-starred in four episodes of Law & Order. She is most recently known for portraying Donovan McNabb's mother in Campbell's Chunky Soup commercials. Lowery has also appeared on the commercials for Colonial Penn.

She also played Maybelle in the Off-Broadway premiere of Before It Hits Home.

Filmography

External links

1946 births
People from Queens, New York
Living people
African-American actresses
American television actresses
Actresses from New York City
21st-century African-American people
21st-century African-American women
20th-century African-American people
20th-century African-American women